Richard Mountford Deeley (24 October 1855 – 19 June 1944) was an English engineer, chiefly noted for his five years as Chief Mechanical Engineer (CME) of the Midland Railway. Richard Deeley is recorded as being born in Derby His father had been an accountant with the Midland Railway and Richard attended grammar school in Chester.

Career
In 1873 he became a pupil of B. Ellington at the Hydraulic Engineering Co in Chester, and two years later he became a pupil of Samuel Waite Johnson at Derby Works. In March 1890 he became chief of the testing department at Derby, then progressed to the position of Inspector of Boilers, Engines and Machinery (March 1893), and to Derby Works Manager in January 1902, adding the post of Electrical Engineer a year later. In July 1903 he also became Assistant Locomotive Superintendent, subsequently replacing Johnson as Locomotive Superintendent on 1 January 1904.

Compound locomotives
He made significant contributions to compounding, adopting Smith's system for his Midland Compound 4-4-0 locomotives. However, the refusal of the company's board to sanction development of larger locomotives, and friction with the new senior managers, led him to resign his post at the end of 1909. After this he continued to work and publish on engineering problems in both railway and non-railway applications.

Patents
  GB190516372, published 28 June 1906, Improvements in valve gear for locomotives or similar coupled steam engines
 GB190604729, published 31 January 1907, Improvements in locomotive superheaters
 GB190605839, published 7 March 1907, Combined spark arrester and ash ejector for locomotive engines    
 GB190910561, published 30 September 1909, Improvements in locomotive boiler stays and the like
 GB190923872  (with Walter Reuben Preston), published 13 October 1910, Improvements in slide valves for motive power engines

References

External links
 
 Richard Deeley at Worldcat

People from Derby
English mechanical engineers
Locomotive builders and designers
Midland Railway people
English railway mechanical engineers
1855 births
1944 deaths